Plantation Island may refer to:
Plantation Island, Florida
Malolo Lailai, Fiji